William Crawford Chalmers (27 July 1860 – 14 May 1940) was a Scottish footballer who played as a goalkeeper for Rangers, Clyde, Middlesbrough Ironopolis and Scotland (gaining one cap in 1885).

Club career 
Chalmers played in Scotland prior to the commencement of the Scottish Football League in 1890; at Rangers, he was involved in their run to the semi-finals of the (English) FA Cup in 1886–87, the last season Scottish clubs were involved.

He moved to north-east England in his trade as a joiner around 1889 and was taken on initially by Birtley for a short spell, then by Middlesbrough Ironopolis where he won the Northern League in both seasons with the club. He was signed by Football League members Darwen in 1892 but had a knee injury which stopped him being able to play and soon led to his retirement. He returned to the Middlesbrough area and later to Scotland.

Representative career 
While with Clyde, Chalmers featured three times for Scotland in unofficial matches in 1889.

He also represented the Glasgow F.A. against various opposition, including against Sheffield in the annual inter-city match on four occasions; the result of his final appearance was an 8–1 win at Hampden on 19 January 1889.

Honours 
Clyde
Graham Charity Cup: 1888–89

Middlesbrough Ironopolis
Northern League: 1890–91, 1891–92

References 

Sources

External links 

Scotland profile, London Hearts Supporters Clubs

1860 births
1940 deaths
Scottish footballers
Footballers from Glasgow
Scotland international footballers
Association football goalkeepers
Northern Football League players
Rangers F.C. players
Middlesbrough Ironopolis F.C. players
Clyde F.C. players
Birtley F.C. players
Darwen F.C. players